Tanko Ishaya is a Nigerian Professor of Computer Science and the vice chancellor of the University of Jos. He was elected into office in December 2021.

Early life and career 
Ishaya obtained a bachelor of science in Mathematics Education from the University of Jos in 1992 and began to teach Mathematics at the College of Agriculture, Zuru, Kebbi State. He completed a Masters Degree in Computation at the University of Manchester in 1997. and completed a Ph.D. in Computing Studies in 2001. After a period of years lecturing at the University of Hull (Scarborough Campus), he returned to Jos, where he was later promoted to a Professor of Computer Science in 2012.

References 

Alumni of the University of Manchester
Academic staff of the University of Jos
University of Jos alumni
Year of birth missing (living people)
Living people